Vladimir Samoilov or Samoylov may refer to:
 Vladimir Samoilov (actor) (1924–1999), Soviet and Russian film and theater actor
 Vladimir Samoilov (figure skater) (born 1999), Russian figure skater
 Vladimir Samoylov (1876–?), Russian fencer